The men's 1500 metres was an event at the 1960 Summer Olympics, held on 3 and 6 September. Thirty-nine athletes from 25 nations competed. The maximum number of athletes per nation had been set at 3 since the 1930 Olympic Congress. The event was won by Herb Elliott of Australia, the nation's second victory in the 1500 metres and first since 1896. Michel Jazy of France took silver, the third time a French athlete had achieved that mark. Hungary won its first 1500 metres medal with István Rózsavölgyi's bronze.

Summary

The 1500 final was much more of an endurance race than contemporary strategic races.  Michel Bernard took the lead from the beginning and dared the field to stay with him.  Arne Hamarsland and Jim Grelle struggled as the pack strung out quickly.  With two laps to go, Herb Elliott upped the ante, taking the lead and pushing the pace.  István Rózsavölgyi was the last to drop off with Jazy close behind Rózsavölgyi.  But Elliott was gone, cleanly ahead going into the final lap.  Waiting on the final backstretch, his coach Percy Cerutty prearranged that he would wave a yellow towel if Elliott was in danger of being caught from behind or close to the world record.  A confused Elliott saw the towel and accelerated, pushing hard to the finish.  Elliott's three second victory took an additional half second out of his own world record.  His record would last for seven years before being improved upon by Jim Ryun.  Behind Elliott, Jazy managed to catch Rózsavölgyi for the silver medal.

Background

This was the 14th appearance of the event, which is one of 12 athletics events to have been held at every Summer Olympics. Twelfth-place finisher Merv Lincoln of Australia was the only finalist from 1956 to return, though multiple semifinalists did. Lincoln's countryman Herb Elliott was the "overwhelming favorite" in the race; he had taken the world records in both the 1500 metres and the mile in 1958 and never lost a race at either distance. Lincoln, as well as Michel Jazy of France and István Rózsavölgyi of Hungary (who had both competed in 1956 without making the final), were expected to compete for silver.

Iraq, Israel, Liechtenstein, Rhodesia, Romania, and Tunisia each made their first appearance in the event. The United States made its 14th appearance, the only nation to have competed in the men's 1500 metres at each Games to that point.

Competition format

The competition used the two-round format that had been in place since 1908 (except for one three-round version in 1952). There were three heats with 14 or 15 runners each (before withdrawals), with the top three runners in each advancing to the final race; the 9-man final was reduced from previous versions of the competition which used a 12-man final.

Records

These were the standing world and Olympic records prior to the 1960 Summer Olympics.

During the final, Herb Elliott broke his own world record by 0.4 seconds, running 3:35.6. The top six men in the final all surpassed the old Olympic record.

Schedule

All times are Central European Time (UTC+1)

Results

Semifinals

The fastest three runners in each of the three heats advanced to the final round.

Semifinal 1

Semifinal 2

Semifinal 3

Final

References

M
1500 metres at the Olympics
Men's events at the 1960 Summer Olympics